Awkward Moment® is a party game that puts 3-8 players in awkward social situations. It was developed by the Tiltfactor Lab as part of a National Science Foundation-funded project called “Transforming Science, Technology, Engineering, and Math (STEM) For Women and Girls: Reworking Stereotypes & Bias.” It is a 20 minute game for middle and high school students (ages 12 and up). The game won Meaningful Play's best non-digital game award in 2012.

Gameplay 

Players take turns assuming the role of the Decider. The Decider reveals a Moment Card that describes a funny, embarrassing, or stressful situation for the group and a Decider Card that provides a guideline for choosing a winning Reaction. Players submit a Reaction Card from their hand face down, and the Decider selects the Reaction Card that he/she thinks is the best response to the Moment, given the Decider Card's rule.

Research 

Awkward Moment challenges players to consider other's viewpoints and assess their own biases. Data suggests that Awkward Moment strengthens associations between women and STEM and reduces people's trained biases.

Versions 
Awkward Moment at Work was released in 2015 and focuses on awkward workplace situations.

References

External links 
 Awkward Moment
 Awkward Moment at Work
 Tiltfactor

American board games